Eupithecia annulata, the larch pug moth, is a moth in the family Geometridae. The species was first described by George Duryea Hulst in 1896. It is found in North America from British Columbia north to the Yukon, east to Newfoundland and Labrador and south to California and Colorado.

The wingspan is about 19 mm. Adults are on wing from April to June.

The larvae feed on Pseudotsuga menziesii, Picea mariana, Picea engelmannii, Picea glauca, Picea engelmannii, Pseudotsuga menziesii var. glauca, Tsuga mertensiana, Tsuga heterophylla, Abies amabilis, Abies grandis, Abies lasiocarpa, Abies lasiocarpa, Quercus garryana, Pinus monticola, Pinus contorta var. latifolia, Larix occidentalis and Thuja plicata. Full-grown larvae reach a length of about 22 mm. There are two morphs. The common morph has a green and brown variant. The second morph has a greenish-brown, reddish-brown or yellowish-brown body and head. Larvae can be found from May to August and pupation occurs from July to August. The species overwinters in the pupal stage.

References

Moths described in 1896
annulata
Moths of North America